Lin Mei-hsiu (born 6 June 1967) is a Taiwanese actress and television host.

Filmography

Television series

Film

Variety show

Music video

Theater

Discography

Singles

Awards and nominations

References

External links

1967 births
Living people
20th-century Taiwanese actresses
21st-century Taiwanese actresses
Taiwanese Buddhists
Taiwanese film actresses
Taiwanese stage actresses
Taiwanese television actresses
Taiwanese television presenters
Taiwanese female dancers
People from Luodong, Yilan County, Taiwan
Taiwanese women television presenters